Villarrealina is a genus of trematodes in the family Opecoelidae. It consists of one species, Villarrealina peruana Bolaños & Salas, 1982.

References

Opecoelidae
Plagiorchiida genera
Monotypic protostome genera